Patrick Kariuki Muiruri (born 5 December 1945) served in the Kenyan parliament for 10 years (1997–2007) representing Gatundu North Constituency. He was the first member of the constituency after it was split from the larger Gatundu Constituency. Muiruri also served as an assistant minister of Production & Marketing in the Ministry of Agriculture.

He lost his seat as Gatundu North Member of parliament to Clement Kungu Waibara in 2007.

References 

1945 births
Living people
Members of the National Assembly (Kenya)